An e-patient is a health consumer who participates fully in his/her medical care, primarily by gathering information about medical conditions that impact them and their families, using the Internet and other digital tools. The term encompasses those who seek guidance for their own ailments and the friends and family members who go online on their behalf. E-patients report two effects of their health research:  "better health information and services, and different, but not always better, relationships with their doctors."

E-patients are active in their care and demonstrate the power of the participatory medicine or Health 2.0 / Medicine 2.0. model of care.  The "e" can stand for "electronic" but has also been used to refer to other terms, such as "equipped", "enabled", "empowered" and "expert".

The current state of knowledge on the impact of e-patients on the healthcare system and the quality of care received indicates:
A growing number of people say the internet played a crucial or important role as they helped another person cope with a major illness.
Many clinicians underestimated the benefits and overestimated the risks of online health resources for patients.
Medical online support groups are an important healthcare resource.
"the net friendliness of clinicians and provider organizations—as rated by the e-patients they serve—is becoming an important new aspect of healthcare quality."
According to one study, the advent of patients as partners is one of the most important cultural medical revolutions of the past century.
In order to understand the impact of the e-patient, clinicians will likely need to move beyond "pre-internet medical constructs". 
Medical education must adapt to take the e-patient into account, and to prepare students for medical practice that includes the e-patient.
A 2011 study of European e-patients found that they tended to be "inquisitive and autonomous" and that they noted that the number of e-patients in Europe appeared to be rising. A 2012 study found that e-patients uploading videos about their health experienced a loss of privacy, but also positive benefits from social support. Furthermore, a 2017 study utilizing social network analysis found that when e-patients are included in health care conferences, they increase information flow, expand propagation, and deepen engagement in the conversation of Tweets when compared to both physicians and researchers while only making up 1.4% of the stakeholder mix.

Inspired by the seminal work on e-patients by Tom Ferguson and the e-Patients Scholars Working Group, Swedish patient and engineer Sara Riggare, in February 2016 coined a new Swedish word: "spetspatient" (in English: "lead user patient" or "lead patient")

See also
Doctor–patient relationship
eHealth
mHealth
Patient opinion leader
Treatment decision support
Virtual patient

References

External links

The rise of the e-patient, Lee Rainie from the Pew Internet and American Life Project presentation at the Medical Library Association, October 7, 2009
E-patients With a Disability or Chronic Disease, from the Pew Internet and American Life Project
Association of Cancer Online Resources (ACOR), an aggregate of e-patient online communities for knowledge-sharing about cancer.
 Haig, Scott (November 8, 2007). "When the patient is a Googler". Time. 
 Who Cares Booklet by the Federal Trade Commission, a guide to health information
 Dave deBronkart: Meet e-Patient Dave, video at TED

Medical terminology
Health informatics
Telehealth
Patient advocacy